Meghimatium burchi is a species of small air-breathing land slug, a terrestrial pulmonate gastropod mollusk in the family Philomycidae and the superfamily Arionacea, the roundback slugs. The specific name burchi is in honor of the American malacologist John B. Burch.

Description
A small species, its body length is around 12 to 16.5 mm.

Distribution
The distribution of Meghimatium burchi includes Taiwan. The type locality is "watershed of Koan-Tau Mt. in Huei-Sun Agriculture Farm, Nantou County", Taiwan. The holotype is deposited at Taichung's National Museum of Natural Science.

References

Philomycidae
Gastropods of Asia
Invertebrates of Taiwan
Endemic fauna of Taiwan
Gastropods described in 2008